The Royal Titles Act 1953 was an act of the Parliament of Ceylon which altered the monarch's title in Ceylon.

The Queen assumed the new title and style by a proclamation on 28 May 1953.

Background 

At the 1952 Commonwealth Prime Ministers' Economic Conference, Commonwealth prime ministers, after months of discussion on whether the newly ascended Queen Elizabeth II should have a uniform Royal Styles and Titles throughout the Commonwealth or whether realms should adopt their own styles and titles, it was agreed that each member of the Commonwealth "should use for its own purposes a form of the Royal Style and Titles which suits its own particular circumstances but retains a substantial element which is common to all". It was decided that the monarch's title in all her realms have, as their common element the description of the Sovereign as "Queen of Her Realms and Territories and Head of the Commonwealth". The prime ministers agreed to pass appropriate legislation in their respective parliaments.

Legislation 

The bill to alter the monarch's style was passed by the Parliament of Ceylon on 7 April 1953. The Act gave Parliament's assent to the adoption of a separate title by the monarch in relation to Ceylon. The title and style proposed in the bill was: Elizabeth the Second, Queen of Ceylon and of Her other Realms and Territories, Head of the Commonwealth.

Commencement 

The Queen assumed the new title and style by a proclamation, sealed with the Great Seal, on 28 May 1953.

Repeal 

The Royal Titles Act was repealed by the Sri Lankan Constitution of 1972, which abolished the Ceylonese monarchy on 22 May 1972.

See also 
Dominion of Ceylon
Governor-General of Ceylon
1953 Coronation Honours (Ceylon)
Royal Style and Titles Act

References 

Monarchy in Ceylon
Politics of Sri Lanka
Parliament of Sri Lanka
Commonwealth royal styles
1953 in Ceylon